The Covert Human Intelligence Sources (Criminal Conduct) Act 2021 (c. 4) is an act of the Parliament of the United Kingdom. The act makes provision for the use of undercover law enforcement agents and covert sources and the committing of crimes in the undertaking of their duty. It was also referred to as the "Spy Cops Bill" – a reference to the UK undercover policing relationships scandal.

Background
The government stated that the act was drafted in response to a court ruling in December 2019 which permitted, in a marginal decision, MI5 and other agencies to commit crimes in order to prevent more serious crimes from occurring.

As a bill, the act was opposed by a number of political organisations and NGOs, including the international human rights advocacy organisation Amnesty International, the Green Party, Scottish National Party, Sinn Féin, and some Labour and Liberal Democrat MPs. In a statement, Amnesty International said:

The Guardian ran an editorial against the bill, saying it was "unfit for purpose". The Morning Star also ran an editorial against the Bill, noting that "even the equivalent legislation in the United States rules out torture and murder, yet nothing is ruled out in this Bill." Lord Macdonald of River Glaven, who served as director of public prosecutions from 2003 to 2008, called for explicit limits on the crimes covered by the Bill. Reprieve's director Maya Foa said that although "our intelligence agencies do a vital job in keeping the country safe, ... there must be common sense limits to their agents' activities". Privacy International director and legal office Ilia Siatitsa added that "the public has a right to know what type of criminal acts MI5's policy authorises in the UK. That's why we're fighting them in court. The new Bill does not alleviate these concerns." 

The general secretaries of 14 trade unions and a number of campaign groups, including Reprieve, the Pat Finucane Centre, the Orgreave Truth and Justice Campaign, Hillsborough Justice Campaign, and Justice 4 Grenfell, released a joint statement in October 2020 expressing their concerns over the bill.

Provisions
The provisions of the act include:

Passage through Parliament
Rather than opposing the government, the Labour Party ordered its MPs to abstain on the vote. Labour's Shadow Security Minister Conor McGinn said that the Bill "addresses a vital issue" of "provid[ing] a clear lawful framework for the use of human intelligence sources", however also highlighted Labour's concerns of potential of the powers in the Bill to be misused. However, the Socialist Campaign Group of MPs rebelled and voted against the Bill on its second reading. The Bill passed a vote on its second reading in the House of Commons on 5 October 2020 by 182 votes to 20. Of the 20 votes against the bill, 17 were Labour MPs, 2 were Plaid Cymru MPs and one was SDLP MP Colum Eastwood.

On the third reading of the Bill, on 15 October 2020, 34 Labour MPs rebelled against the order to abstain, including Shadow Ministers Dan Carden and Margaret Greenwood, as well as five parliamentary private secretaries, who all resigned from their frontbench roles. An amendment to prevent authorisation of serious offences was tabled by Labour leader Keir Starmer, but was defeated by 317 votes to 256. The Bill's third reading passed by 313 votes to 98.

When the Bill reached the House of Lords in January 2021, peers defeated the government in passing two amendments to curtail use of children, and to stop informants participating in the most serious crimes such as murder, torture, and rape. A third amendment by Shami Chakrabarti seeking to prevent immunity for undercover agents was defeated after the Labour leadership chose to abstain. The government argued in response that once a particular crime is explicitly outside the limit of the act, then that crime will be used as a way to "unmask infiltrators" in criminal organisations. Shami Chakrabarti, a member of the House of Lords and the former director of Liberty, pointed out that as under UK law prosecution must be in the public interest, a prosecutor wouldn't charge an agent who was breaking the law in the course of their duty.

Upon the return of the bill to the Commons, the amendments preventing the use of minors and vulnerable people and the participation in serious crimes were defeated in a 363 to 267 vote. An amendment tabled by the Labour frontbench was not put to a vote.

See also

UK undercover policing relationships scandal

Notes

References

United Kingdom Acts of Parliament 2021
2021 in British law
2021 in British politics
Governance of policing in the United Kingdom
Law enforcement in the United Kingdom
British intelligence agencies